The El Bosque University, is a coeducational, nonsectarian private university located in north Bogotá, Colombia. Founded in 1977, the university currently offers 20 undergraduate programs, as well as several specializations, Master's degrees and Doctorates.

References

Educational institutions established in 1977
Universities and colleges in Bogotá
1977 establishments in Colombia